Darbydale is an unincorporated community and census-designated place (CDP) in central Pleasant Township, Franklin County, Ohio, United States. It was an incorporated village until its disincorporation on December 27, 1985. As of the 2010 census, the population was 793.

The community is located in the southwest part of Franklin County, on the north side of Big Darby Creek, a tributary of the Scioto River.

Demographics

References

Census-designated places in Franklin County, Ohio
Former municipalities in Ohio
Populated places disestablished in 1985